Scottsdale Preparatory Academy is a charter school in Scottsdale, Arizona owned by Great Hearts Academies. It serves grades 5 to 12. It moved to a different campus in the 2011–2012 school year, also accommodating the fifth grade portion of GHA's Scottsdale Archway Academy. The school is a member of the Great Hearts Academies.

The first senior class graduated in the 2011–2012 school year.

References

Charter schools in Arizona
Education in Scottsdale, Arizona
Educational institutions established in 2007
Schools in Maricopa County, Arizona
Public high schools in Arizona
Public middle schools in Arizona
2007 establishments in Arizona